Alan Shuptrine (born March 31, 1963) is a painter known for his Southern and Appalachian Mountains genre. He is a frame-maker, water gilder, and watercolorist. He is the son of painter Hubert Shuptrine (1936-2006).

Biography

Childhood and education 

Born in 1963, Alan was raised in more than 20 Appalachian Mountain towns along the Eastern seaboard.  During 1970-1974, while the family was living in Highlands, North Carolina, his father began writing his first book, Jericho: The South Beheld (1974). The book, written with author James Dickey, sold over 1 million copies worldwide, was nominated for a Pulitzer Prize for the art book category, and received the Carey-Thomas Award for Creative Publishing. Using Highlands as home base, Hubert would travel all over the South for his inspirations, and would often take Alan along. Hubert became Alan's mentor and teacher. In 1975, the family returned to Chattanooga where Alan attended school on Lookout Mountain before beginning The Baylor School in Chattanooga, Tennessee, in 1976. After graduation from high school, Alan continued his education at The University of the South and The University of Tennessee.

Framing / restoration / water gilding 
In 1985, after graduation from college, Alan began working his father, who at the time was writing his second book, Home to Jericho. Alan began framing for his father, handcrafting custom water gilded frames. This led to framing for other artists including Andrew Wyeth. In 1987 Alan began his own company, Gold Leaf Designs, Inc. (Chattanooga, TN). While continuing to frame for his father, he also began framing for museums, art galleries, artists, historical institutions, designers, and interior decorators. Gold Leaf Designs, Inc, became known for handcrafting one-of-a-kind mirrors and furniture, as well as creating gilded walls, ceilings, and objects of art. Alan's frames and period restorations can be found nationwide, in museums, historical institutions, and private collections, including The Greenville County Museum of Art, The Hunter Museum of American Art, The Birmingham Museum of Art, The Huntsville Museum of Art,  The Montgomery Museum of Fine Arts, The Tennessee State Museum, The New Orleans Museum of Art, and The Columbia Museum of Art.  In 2005, following the devastation from Hurricane Katrina, The New Orleans Museum of Art reached out to Alan for on-site repairs and restorations of the frames and gilded objects within the permanent collection.  He has also provided extensive period restoration and conservation for numerous museums and historical institutions, including  Melrose Plantation at Natchez National Historical Park, The Philip Schutze Collection at the Atlanta History Center's  historical Swan House, the Governor's Mansion of Georgia, the Governor's Mansion of South Carolina, the President James K. Polk Home and Museum , and Cheekwood Estate and Gardens (Nashville, TN).  In September, 2022, Alan was invited to exhibit his gilded and sgraffito works at the Florence Academy of Artin Florence, Italy, as well as teach a master class in water gilding.  He has been invited to return for an encore class in 2024.

Watercolor career 
Though framing and restoration became a primary focus, Alan continued to paint and be mentored by his father. In 2005, Hubert Shuptrine was awarded the Tennessee Governor's Arts Award by the Tennessee Arts Commission and then-Governor, Phil Bredesen.  Alan was present with his father during this time, as he served as Hubert's representative for the previous 15 years. Hubert passed away in 2006 following some health issues. Alan Shuptrine's painting style is Realism, much like his father's, with highly detailed and dramatic lighting in his landscapes and figurative paintings.  Shuptrine's medium is primarily watercolor which he applies and controls in various techniques, from wet-in-wet to dry-brush.  He also creates using egg tempera, oil paint, water gilding with genuine gold leaf, wood carving, and sgraffito.  He prefers to handcraft and carve his own frames for his paintings, a practice of two of his influences: James McNeill Whistler, and Charles Prendergast. His other influences include the works of his father, Hubert Shuptrine, Andrew Wyeth, Winslow Homer, Thomas Eakins, Stephen Scott Young, and John Singer Sargent.

Recognized by publications such as American Artist Magazine and Watercolor Artist Magazine, Shuptrine garnered additional recognition when he was asked to participate in an exhibit, "In the Tradition of Wyeth: Contemporary Watercolor Masters", at the Vero Beach Museum of Art in 2010.  The exhibition opened with Alan's paintings displayed alongside the works by Andrew Wyeth and his father.

Following the Vero Beach exhibition, Shuptrine participated in a solo two-year, four-museum run in 2017-2019 with the exhibition, Alan Shuptrine: Appalachian Watercolors of the Serpentine Chain.  The exhibition was displayed at the Morris Museum of Art, the Huntsville Museum of Art and The Tennessee State Museum. All three museums selected Shuptrine's watercolors for their permanent collections. His solo exhibition opened at the Tennessee State Museum in Nashville and celebrated the Celtic roots of the Appalachian Mountains.

Book 
In 2019-2020, Shuptrine collaborated with author and Appalachian Trail expert Jennifer Pharr Davis.  This book is self-published and titled I Come From A Place. This  book contains a collection of images from Shuptrine's museum exhibition, as well as newer watercolors. The book was awarded the Independent Publisher's Book Award for Best Southeastern Non-Fiction Book for 2020.

Shuptrine continues to create new works as he plans for his an upcoming museum exhibition. He also provides watercolor lessons and workshops geared towards all levels of artists.

Personal life 
Alan Shuptrine and his wife Bonny reside in Lookout Mountain, Georgia. They own Shuptrine's Gallery, located in the Broad Street Design District in Chattanooga, Tennessee. The gallery exhibits American art and provides custom framing and period restoration.

Upcoming events 
Shuptrine has been invited to be an Artist in Residence for the Palmetto Bluff / Montage Resort in Bluffton, SC for August, 2023.  He will offering workshops and an exhibition of his works in the on-site FLOW Gallery.

Exhibitions and recognitions

Exhibitions. 
Featured Artist, Grand Bohemian Gallery – The Kessler Collection, Asheville, NC, Fall 2022
Shuptrine- A Gilded Age, Florence Academy of Art, Italy 2022
American Watercolor Society, Associate Members Exhibition, 2022
Featured Artist, Paderewski Fine Art & The Sportsman’s Gallery Ltd. 
Arts at Erlanger, Erlanger Baroness Hospital, Chattanooga, TN, 2021 and 2022
ArtFields, Selected Artist and Featured Speaker, Lake City, SC, 2021 and May 2022
Featured Artist, Grand Bohemian Gallery – The Kessler Collection, Birmingham, AL, April 2020 and 2021
Biltmore Farms Featured Speaker, Asheville, NC, May 2019
Reframed:  American Women from the Sellars Collection featuring framing by Alan Shuptrine, The Huntsville Museum of Art, Summer 2019
Generations, Monthaven Arts and Cultural Center, Hendersonville, TN, 2019
Alan Shuptrine: Appalachian Watercolors of The Serpentine Chain,  Tennessee State Museum (Nashville, TN) in May, 2017, Morris Museum of Art (Augusta, GA), January–April, 2018;  Huntsville Museum of Art (AL), May- August, 2018; Museum Center a 5ive Points (Cleveland, TN), September 2018-January, 2019.
In the Tradition of Wyeth: Contemporary Watercolor Masters, Vero Beach Museum of Art, Vero Beach FL, 2011-2012
The Serpentine Chain Collection Preview, Tennessee Association of Museums, Nashville, TN, 2016
Tennessee Watercolor Society Juried Exhibition, Nashville, TN, 2016
Water Gilding: A Lost Art, Huntsville Museum of Art, Huntsville, AL, 2016
The Serpentine Chain Collection Preview, The Poinsett Club, Greenville, SC, 2016
The Serpentine Chain Collection Preview, The Biltmore Forest Country Club, Asheville, NC, 2015
The Bascom Guest Instructor Exhibition, Highlands, NC, 2014
Hudson Valley Art Association Juried Exhibition, New York, 2013
National Watercolor Society Members Juried Exhibition Finalist, 2012
National Watercolor Society, Finalist in Members Juried Exhibition, San Pedro, California, 2011
The Bascom: A Center for the Visual Arts, Members Exhibition, Highlands, NC, 2010
Tennessee Watercolor Society Annual Juried Exhibition, Chattanooga, TN, 2010
Salmagundi Art Club Floral Exhibition, NY, 2010
Huntsville Museum of Art Annual Gala, Huntsville Museum of Art, Huntsville, AL, 2009
The Southern Watercolor Society Juried Annual Exhibition Finalist, 2009
Spectrum, Hunter Museum of American Art, Chattanooga, TN, 2009
Salmagundi Art Club Annual Juried Painting/Sculpture Exhibition, Non-Members, NYC, 2008
Tennessee Watercolor Society Annual Juried Exhibition, Knoxville, TN, 2008

Recognitions 
Distinguished Alumnus Award, The Baylor School, Chattanooga, TN, 2021
First Place and Best in Show for Watercolor, Mountain View Americana Art Show, South Carolina, 2021
I Come From A Place, Independent Publisher's 2020 Book Award for Best Southeastern Non-Fiction
My Artist Portfolio Landscape 2012 International Juried Competition, Honorable Mention, 2012
American Artist Magazine All Media Competition, Watercolor Honorable Mention, 2012
35th Annual Southern Watercolor Society Juried Exhibition Finalist, Winner of the Colart Americas (Winsor and Newton) Award, 2012
Tennessee Watercolor Society Biennial Juried Exhibition Finalist, Winner of the Beauty of Water Media Award, and achieved Signature Membership, 2012
Salmagundi Art Club Annual Juried Exhibition, Certificate of Merit, 2011, NYC
Tennessee Watercolor Society Juried Exhibition, Outstanding Technical Award, 2010
Cover Finalist for American Artist Watercolor Magazine, Summer 2008 Issue
Artist Colony Annual International Online Exhibition, 2nd Place Overall, 2008

Acknowledgements 
"There is nothing more challenging for the artist than the choice to work in water color.  For Alan Shuptrine, it has literally been a family passion as he has followed his father into this most demanding medium to great acclaim for them both. Years ago, I had the privilege of visiting Winslow Homer's studio and found on the wall written in pencil the following words in Homer's own hand. “Oh what a friend chance can be, when it chooses.” The finest watercolor artists may embrace the “happy accident” now and then, but there is nothing accidental, and everything intentional when Alan captures a moment in life for the viewer to have, keep and cherish. It is artwork to be admired and embraced for all time.   The eye delights, and the mind engages."   

-Jim Dicke

CEO, Crown Equipment Corporation

"Shuptrine's drybrush watercolors depend on a delicate but precise touch, like the lyrical melodic line of a flat-picked mountain guitar. Drybrush is a difficult technique pioneered by another well-known storyteller, Andrew Wyeth, whose influence on Alan's work is undeniable. These words and pictures are like a series of sweet mountain melodies, gathered into a songbook to celebrate Appalachia in warm humanistic terms."

-Jay Williams

Former Curator, Vero Beach Museum of Art

"For Alan, the love of Appalachian life is deep rooted. It has been woven into in his creative DNA from his days hiking the Blue Ridge and Smoky Mountains with his father, to time spent visiting the remote hill towns with their fiercely independent people. Alan's subjects and compositions capture a feeling of American country life steeped in a spirit similar to that of Andrew Wyeth."

-Christopher Madkour

Executive Director, Huntsville Museum of Art

"Alan Shuptrine created a body of work that celebrates the connections of our Appalachian Mountains. His paintings embody the spirit of the land in the craft of its people. The work of Alan Shuptrine is represented in the collection of the Tennessee State Museum because of his artistic excellence and connection to Tennessee, and America's, history."

-Ashley Howell

Executive Director, Tennessee State Museum

References 

20th-century American painters
American male painters
21st-century American painters
1963 births
Realist painters
Living people
20th-century American male artists